Buna Werke may refer to:

 Buna Werke Schkopau, the first large-scale synthetic rubber plant in Schkopau, Germany
 Monowitz Buna Werke, a former synthetic rubber plant with attached forced labour camp near Oświęcim, Poland